= 2018 Varanasi flyover collapse =

Bridge collapse in Varanasi, India

- Date: 15 May 2018
- Time: Evening
- Location: Varanasi
- Cause: Flyover collapse
- Deaths: at least 18

On 15 May 2018, a flyover bridge collapsed in Varanasi, Uttar Pradesh, killing at least 18 and injuring many.

a segment of a flyover under construction by a government-owned corporation collapsed onto a bustling street in Varanasi, resulting in at least 18 people fatalities as it smashed into a minibus, cars, and motorcycles.

There are concerns that the death toll could increase.

Even hours after the incident, it is suspected that individuals remain trapped beneath the debris of the flyover, with multiple cranes mobilized to remove the concrete girder that fell at approximately 4 pm on the road leading to the Varanasi-Allahabad highway.
